Gianluca Triuzzi (born 9 September 1978 in Grottaglie, Italy) is an Italian professional football forward who is currently contracted to Fragagnano, but played in Serie A earlier in his career, notably for Parma F.C., for whom he played in two matches in the 1996–97 season.

References

External links

1978 births
Living people
Italian footballers
Serie A players
Serie B players
Taranto F.C. 1927 players
Parma Calcio 1913 players
Palermo F.C. players
S.S.C. Napoli players
A.C. Monza players
Spezia Calcio players
Delfino Pescara 1936 players
S.S. Virtus Lanciano 1924 players
Association football forwards